Alejandro Ropero (born 17 April 1998) is a Spanish racing cyclist, who currently rides for UCI ProTeam .

Major results

2019
 1st Stage 4 Vuelta a Zamora
 1st Stage 1 Vuelta al Bidasoa
 2nd Overall Tour of Galicia
2020
 7th Overall Giro Ciclistico d'Italia
1st Stage 1
2021
 9th Giro dell'Appennino

References

External links

1998 births
Living people
Spanish male cyclists
Sportspeople from the Province of Granada
Cyclists from Andalusia